KhanThang Paite is an Indian football player who plays in midfielder for Mohammedan in the I-League.

Career

Early career
Paite is the product of the Tata Football Academy from where he graduated in 2006.

He joined Churchill Brothers and played in the Goa Professional League. In 2009, he was elevated to the first team and was used mainly as a second-half substitute. He spent five years at Churchill Brothers from 2006 and was also a key member of the squad that won the 2008-09 I-League.

The nippy left-footed came into the spotlight after scoring against Mohammedan S.C. in 2008-09 which eventually helped Churchill Brothers win the title. He moved to Kolkata and spent one season with East Bengal. Then in 2012 he was loaned to Pune F.C.

Mohammedan
On 30 May 2013 it was confirmed that Paite has signed for Mohammedan on a one-year contract.
He made his debut in the I-League on 21 September 2013 against Pune F.C. at the Salt Lake Stadium in which he came on as a substitute for Penn Orji in the 35th minute as Mohammedan lost the match 1-3.

References

External links
 Goal Profile
 

1986 births
Living people
People from Churachandpur district
Indian footballers
India international footballers
I-League players
Footballers from Manipur
Churchill Brothers FC Goa players
East Bengal Club players
Pune FC players
Mohammedan SC (Kolkata) players
Association football midfielders